Archie Patrick Allen (born March 18, 1913 – November 1, 2006) was an American college baseball coach, serving primarily as head coach of the Springfield College team from 1948–1978.

Playing career
After 3 seasons as an outfielder at Springfield College, Allen played professionally for the Norfolk Tars, Binghamton Triplets, Scranton Red Sox and Tulsa Oilers.

Coaching career
After coaching in high school, Allen joined John Bunn's coaching staff at Springfield College.

Post-coaching career
In 1983, Allen served as commissioner of the Cape Cod Baseball League, a collegiate summer baseball league in Massachusetts.

Head coaching record

References

1913 births
2006 deaths
baseball outfielders
Springfield Pride baseball players
Norfolk Tars players
Binghamton Triplets players
Scranton Red Sox players
Tulsa Oilers (baseball) players
Springfield Pride baseball coaches
Cape Cod Baseball League